The Oil Palm Aphid (Schizaphis rotundiventris), also known as Schizaphis (Schizaphis) rotundiventris, is an aphid in the superfamily Aphidoidea in the order Hemiptera. It is a true bug and sucks sap from plants.

References

 https://www.itis.gov/servlet/SingleRpt/SingleRpt?search_topic=TSN&search_value=200668
 http://animaldiversity.org/accounts/Schizaphis_rotundiventris/classification/
 http://aphid.speciesfile.org/Common/basic/Taxa.aspx?TaxonNameID=1166104
 https://www.gbif.org/species/2075929

Agricultural pest insects
Aphidini